Rodrigo González may refer to:
Rodrigo González de Lara (fl. 1078–1143), medieval Spanish nobleman
Rodrigo González Girón (died 1256), medieval Spanish nobleman
 Rodrigo González Torres (born 1941), Chilean politician
Rockdrigo González (1950–1985), Mexican musician and songwriter
Rodrigo González Barrios (born 1958), Mexican politician
Rodrigo González (swimmer) (born 1968), Mexican swimmer at the 1988 Summer Olympics
Rodrigo González (musician) (born 1968), Chilean-German musician
Rodrigo González (footballer, born April 1995), Mexican footballer
Rodrigo González (footballer, born November 1995), Chilean footballer
Rodrigo González (footballer, born 2000), Argentine footballer
Rodrigo González (triathlete) (born 1989), Mexican triathlete